Snertingdal is a former municipality in the old Oppland county, Norway. The  municipality existed from 1910 until its dissolution in 1964. The area is now part of Gjøvik Municipality in the traditional district of Vestoppland. The administrative centre was the village of Seegård.

History

The municipality of Snertingdal was established on 1 January 1910 when the municipality of Biri was divided in half. The western part (population: 2,028) became Snertingdal Municipality and the eastern part (population: 2,815) continued as Biri Municipality. During the 1960s, there were many municipal mergers across Norway due to the work of the Schei Committee. On 1 January 1964, the municipality of Snertingdal (population: 2,471) was merged with the town of Gjøvik (population: 8,251), the municipality of Biri (population: 3,274), and most of the municipality of Vardal (population: (9,612) to create a new Gjøvik Municipality with 23,608 residents.

Name
The municipality was named Snertingdalen after the Snertingdalen valley in which it is located. The first element of the valley name is Snartheimr which comes from the old "Snartum" farm and church site in the valley. The first part of this name is possibly from an old river name and the last element is heimr which means "home". The last element of the valley name is dalr which means "dale" or "valley". In 1918, the spelling of the name was changed from "Snertingdalen" to just "Snertingdal".

Government
All municipalities in Norway, including Snertingdal, are responsible for primary education (through 10th grade), outpatient health services, senior citizen services, unemployment and other social services, zoning, economic development, and municipal roads. The municipality was governed by a municipal council of elected representatives, which in turn elected a mayor.

Municipal council
The municipal council  of Snertingdal was made up of 17 representatives that were elected to four year terms.  The party breakdown of the final municipal council was as follows:

Mayor
The mayors of Snertingdal:

1910-1910: Kristian Oudenstad
1911-1913: Kristian Markeng
1914-1916: Kristian Oudenstad
1917-1928: Anton E. Haugen (AD)
1929-1931: Johannes Kirkerud (Bp)
1932-1938: Lars Ødegårdstuen (RF)
1938-1940: Anders Tandberg (Ap)
1945-1963: Anders Tandberg (Ap)

See also
List of former municipalities of Norway

References

Gjøvik
Former municipalities of Norway
1910 establishments in Norway
1964 disestablishments in Norway